Mihitikri is a census town in Kolaghat CD block in Tamluk subdivision of Purba Medinipur district in the state of West Bengal, India.

Geography

Location

Urbanisation
94.08% of the population of Tamluk subdivision live in the rural areas. Only 5.92% of the population live in the urban areas, and that is the second lowest proportion of urban population amongst the four subdivisions in Purba Medinipur district, just above Egra subdivision.

Note: The map alongside presents some of the notable locations in the subdivision. All places marked in the map are linked in the larger full screen map.

Demographics
As per 2011 Census of India Mihitikri had a total population of 6,906 of which 3,541 (51%) were males and 3,365 (49%) were females. Population below 6 years was 630. The total number of literates in Mihitikri was 5,296 (84.38% of the population over 6 years).

Infrastructure
As per the District Census Handbook 2011, Mihitikri covered an area of 2.1513 km2. It had the facility of a railway station at Mecheda 3 km away and bus route in the town. Amongst the civic amenities it had 600 domestic electric connections. Amongst the medical facilities it had a hospital 2 km away, a nursing home 2 km away, a dispensary/ health centre 1 km away, a maternity home 1 km away and 1 medicine shop in the town. Amongst the educational facilities it had were 4 primary schools, 2 middle schools, 2 secondary schools and 1 senior secondary school in the town. The nearest degree college was at Panskura 14 km away. Amongst the recreational and cultural facilities a cinema theatre was there at Mecheda 4 km away and a reading room in the town.

Transport
Mihitikri is off National Highway 16 (Kolkata-Mumbai Highway).

References

Cities and towns in Purba Medinipur district